WLAM (1470 AM) is a radio station broadcasting an oldies format. Licensed to Lewiston, Maine, United States, the station serves the Lewiston-Auburn area.  Established in 1947, the station is owned by Robert Bittner through licensee Blue Jey Broadcasting Co.. Its 5,000-watt signal can be heard at day throughout most of Southern Maine and portions of New Hampshire and Massachusetts, and at night throughout most of New England and portions of New York and Canada.

History
WLAM first went on the air September 4, 1947.  The station initially aired various programs, including ABC Radio programming, music, and local sports coverage.  An FM sister station on 100.1, WWAV (now WTHT on 99.9) was launched in 1977. The station became WKZN on December 26, 1990, swapping call letters with its sister station in Gorham on 870; the two stations eventually began simulcasting a standards format. On July 19, 1993, WKZN changed its call sign to WZOU.

Wireless Talking Machine Company sold WZOU, WLAM, and WLAM-FM (106.7 FM, which had launched in 1996 as an FM simulcast of the stations; it is now WXTP), along with 99.9 (by then WMWX) and WTHT (107.5 FM; now WFNK) to Harron Communications, then-owner of WMTW-TV, in 1999.  On May 21, 2001, Harron restored the WLAM call letters to the station; two weeks prior to this, 870 and 106.7 were converted to news/talk as WMTW.  While WLAM initially retained the standards format, on November 26, the station was switched to a simulcast of WMTW; shortly afterwards, talk programming was removed from the stations in favor of an all-news format, mainly from the Associated Press's All-News Radio service.

After Harron sold its Maine radio stations to Nassau Broadcasting Partners in 2004, Newsradio WMTW was discontinued.  Nassau also introduced three separate formats to the stations, with WLAM reverting to standards. This incarnation of the format would prove short-lived; in late 2005, the station switched to ESPN Radio.

One of WLAM's personalities during its standards incarnations was Bud Sawyer, a longtime staple of Portland-area radio stations such as WPOR, who was the station's morning host from 1998 until the 2001 switch to news/talk, and again during the mid-2000s restoration of the standards format.

WLAM had planned to drop ESPN Radio in favor of programming from Boston's WEEI in January 2008, but the deal between Nassau and Entercom ended up collapsing.  The ESPN Radio format would remain until February 2, 2009, when WLAM and WLVP switched to an oldies format.  In conjunction with the change, the stations began simulcasting WCSH's morning and early evening newscasts, a move made to continue the newscasts' availability via radio even after WCSH's own 87.7 MHz audio was discontinued following the shutdown of analog television signals.

Initially locally programmed, in early 2010 WLAM and WLVP became affiliates of The True Oldies Channel.  Additionally, on August 2, the station added The Jeff Santos Show from WWZN in Boston; this in effect took WLAM's morning drive programming back to a news/talk format, as Santos' program immediately follows the simulcast of WCSH's morning newscast.  The stations' format was modified once more on August 6, 2011, when sports talk was re-added to the schedule 7 days a week via locally produced shows and high school football and basketball from the Maine Sports Network (which previously provided some weekend programming to WJJB-FM).

WLAM, along with 16 other Nassau stations in northern New England, was purchased at bankruptcy auction by WBIN Media Company, a company controlled by Bill Binnie, on May 22, 2012. Binnie already owned WBIN-TV in Derry, New Hampshire. The deal was completed on November 30, 2012. On December 9, 2015, Binnie agreed to sell WLAM and WLVP to Blue Jey Broadcasting Company, controlled by Bob Bittner, for $135,000. The sale to Blue Jey Broadcasting was consummated on February 17, 2016.

Translator

References

External links

Oldies radio stations in the United States
Adult standards radio stations in the United States
Radio stations established in 1947
LAM
1947 establishments in Maine